The  is an endangered German breed of domestic chicken. It originates from the area of the city of Augsburg, in the Swabian region of the state of Bavaria, in southern Germany. It was bred in the nineteenth century, and derives mostly from the French La Flèche breed. It is the only chicken breed of Bavarian origin.

History 

The Augsburger was created by Julius Meyer, of the small town of Haunstetten, now part of the city of Augsburg, in the Swabian region of the state of Bavaria, in southern Germany. In 1870 or 1880, he cross-bred birds of the French La Flèche breed, prized for the quality of its meat, with an Italian breed or type – now extinct – named Lamotta, which was a good layer of eggs. The aim was to create a dual-purpose chicken which would combine both qualities. The first written description of the Augsburger is that of Jean Bungartz in 1885.

The Augsburger became popular, and spread to the area of Stuttgart and as far as the Black Forest. A breeders' association was formed in 1923 at Mühlhausen, in the Ruhr, but did not last long. Under the National Socialist régime the Augsburger was not officially recognised, and could not be exhibited at poultry shows. In 1938 a new breeders' association, the Sonderverein der Züchter des Augsburger Huhnes, was formed. From the 1960s the Augsburger began to suffer from competition from specialised high-productivity breeds, and its popularity waned.

Today the Augsburger is a rare breed. It is listed in category I, "extremely endangered", on the Rote Liste of the Gesellschaft zur Erhaltung alter und gefährdeter Haustierrassen. In 2005, 40 cocks and 164 hens were recorded; in 2009 there were 35 breeders with 64 cocks and 289 hens.

A bantam Augsburger was recognised in 1975.

Characteristics 

The Augsburger is well adapted to the climatic conditions of its area of origin, the Bavarian Plateau. The usual plumage colouring is black, with greenish lights; after the Re-unification of Germany in 1990, a new colour variant, blue-laced, was added to the standard. The Augsburger has an unusual cup-shaped or rose-comb, similar to that of the Siciliana breed of Sicily, and quite unlike the v-shaped comb of the La Flèche breed. The earlobes are white.

Use 

The Augsburger is a dual-purpose breed, with good meat qualities. Hens lay approximately 180 white eggs per year, which average  in weight.

References

Chicken breeds
Chicken breeds originating in Germany
Animal breeds on the GEH Red List